Mastododera fallaciosa is a species in the Lepturinae subfamily within the long-horned beetle family. This beetle is found on the island of Madagascar.

References

Lepturinae
Beetles described in 1982